Sawa may refer to:

Places
 Sawa, Nepal, a village development committee
 Sawa, Lesser Poland Voivodeship, Poland, a village
 Saveh, sometimes transliterated Sāwa, Iran, a city
 Sawa Lake, Iraq

People
 Sawa (Hrycuniak) (born Michał Hrycuniak in 1938), Metropolitan of Warsaw and all Poland and leader of the Polish Orthodox Church
 Devon Sawa (born 1978), Canadian actor
 Homare Sawa (born 1978), Japanese footballer
 Masakatsu Sawa (born 1983), Japanese footballer
 Munenori Sawa (born 1978), Japanese professional wrestler
 , Japanese voice actress
 Sawa (singer), Japanese techno-pop singer and DJ

Other uses
 Sawa Station (Ibaraki), a railway station in Hitachinaka, Ibaraki Prefecture, Japan
 Sawa Station (Nagano), a railway station in Minowa, Nagano Prefecture, Japan
 SAWA Defence Training Center, Eritrea, a military academy
 SAWA (Non-profit organization)
 Radio Sawa, an Arabic-language radio station
 Sawa, legendary character from the myth of the founding of the city of Warsaw
 Sawa, protagonist of the 1998 film Kite

See also
Sava (disambiguation)
Sahwa (disambiguation)

Japanese feminine given names
Japanese-language surnames